Myrtastrum is a genus of plants in the Myrtaceae first described as a genus in 1941. It contains only one known species, Myrtastrum rufopunctatum, endemic to New Caledonia. It is a phylogenetically isolated genus within the tribe Myrteae.

References

Myrtaceae
Endemic flora of New Caledonia
Monotypic Myrtaceae genera
Taxa named by Adolphe-Théodore Brongniart
Taxa named by Jean Armand Isidore Pancher
Taxa named by Jean Antoine Arthur Gris
Taxa named by Max Burret